Pablo Javier Garabello (born 3 September 1973) is an Argentine football manager and former player who played as a midfielder. He is the current manager for Liga Nacional club Iztapa.

Playing career
Born in Buenos Aires, Garabello represented Los Andes, San Lorenzo, River Plate and Argentinos Juniors as a youth. He made his senior debut with American side Florida Strikers, before playing for local sides San Martín de Burzaco and Barracas Central before retiring.

Managerial career
After managing River Plate's youth sides, Garabello started his managerial career with JJ Urquiza in 2003. After working as an assistant manager at Argentino de Merlo, San Miguel and Excursionistas, he joined José Pékerman's staff at Toluca in 2007.

Garabello worked as Pékerman's assistant in 2009 at Tigres UANL before being named manager of Leandro N. Alem in December 2010. He resigned from the club the following 9 May, after a 1–3 loss against Talleres de Remedios de Escalada.

In 2012, Garabello returned to work with Pékerman as his assistant in the Colombia national team. On 10 May 2019, he was named manager of Colombian side Cúcuta Deportivo, but left in a mutual consent on 13 August.

In February 2020, Garabello was appointed manager of Categoría Primera B side Fortaleza. On 3 December, he took over Peruvian side UTC.

References

External links

1973 births
Living people
Footballers from Buenos Aires
Argentine footballers
Association football midfielders
Florida Strikers players
San Martín de Burzaco footballers
Barracas Central players
Argentine expatriate footballers
Argentine expatriate sportspeople in the United States
Expatriate soccer players in the United States
Argentine football managers
Cúcuta Deportivo managers
Argentine expatriate football managers
Argentine expatriate sportspeople in Mexico
Argentine expatriate sportspeople in Colombia
Argentine expatriate sportspeople in Peru
Expatriate football managers in Colombia
Expatriate football managers in Peru
Universidad Técnica de Cajamarca managers